This is a list of electricity-generating power stations in the U.S. state of North Dakota, sorted by type and name. In 2021, North Dakota had a total summer capacity of 9,187 MW through all of its power plants, and a net generation of 42,176 GWh. The corresponding electrical energy generation mix was 57.1% coal, 3.5% natural gas, 5.2% hydroelectric and 34.1% wind. Petroleum liquids and waste-heat recovery generated most of the remaining 0.2%.

North Dakota contains the world's largest known deposit of lignite coal, and hosted 4% of U.S. coal extraction in year 2019. It ranked second behind the state of Texas in U.S. crude oil extraction. Natural gas extraction has been growing as well, and exceeded 1 trillion cubic feet for the first time.

North Dakota oil extraction included the flaring of over 200 billion cubic feet of associated petroleum gas in year 2019.  Operations were widely distributed throughout the Bakken Formation which underlays the northwest region of the state. This record-high volume of wasted natural gas could have generated over 30,000 GWh of electrical energy, an amount equal to three-quarters of the state's total generation.

Nuclear power stations 
North Dakota had no utility-scale plants that used fissile material as a fuel in 2019.

Fossil-fuel power stations 
Data from the U.S. Energy Information Administration serves as a general reference.

Coal and Lignite
A useful map of active and retiring coal generation plants is provided by the Sierra Club.

Natural Gas and Petroleum

Renewable power stations 
Data from the U.S. Energy Information Administration serves as a general reference.

Hydroelectric

Wind

Also see Wind Industry of North Dakota Map.

Solar

There are currently no operating utility-scale solar farms in North Dakota.  National Grid Renewables, formerly known as Geronimo Energy, has been developing several potential projects within the state,  including the 200 MW Harmony Solar Project in Cass county and the 128 MW Wild Spring Solar Project in Pennington county.

References

Lists of buildings and structures in North Dakota
 
North Dakota